Hooman Haji Abdollahi  is an Iranian actor, television presenter, voice actor born on 14 July 1975.

Biography 
The most famous role in the field of his acting is Rahmatollah Amini Shalikar hezarjaribi.
He has been a member of Glory Entertainment (The Association of Tehran Young Voice Actors) for a short time.
He has dubbed many roles, include Monsters vs. Aliens (as Dr. cockroach), Meet the Robinsons (as Grandpa), Barnyard (as Miles) and (Two Pizza Sellers), The Wild (as Zoo Squirrel), Avatar: The Last Airbender, SpongeBob SquarePants (as SpongeBob), Shrek (as Shrek), Happy Feet (as Shahin), Five Children and It, Coconut (as Lengeh).
At the 37th Fajr International Theater Festival, he won the Best Actor award for his play in "Reincarnation 3 to 35 Tomans" in the "Iran Two" theater event .

Career

Television

TV Presenter

Voice acting
Coconut (Home video) (Voice actor of doll)
Rainbow (Chapel voice actor)
Rainbow (Pengul voice actor)
Pengul or Cats City(Pengul voice actor)
khandevaneh (farkhondeh voice actor)
Pagard

Dubbing
Ice Age (2002 film)
Ice Age 3
SpongeBob SquarePants
Barnyard (as Miles / Pizzerias)
Happy Feet
Meet the Robinsons
Avatar: The Last Airbender
Monsters vs. Aliens
Five Children and It
The Wild
The Legend of Arash
Angry Birds
Finding Dory
Soul

Stand-up comedy
Top Laughing

Home video

References

External links
 
 

Iranian male film actors
1975 births
Living people
Iranian male voice actors
Male actors from Tehran